Psycho Jukebox is the debut solo album by Jon Fratelli, frontman of The Fratellis and formerly of Codeine Velvet Club. Released on 25 July 2011. It was recorded with Tony Hoffer (who produced Costello Music and mixed Codeine Velvet Club) in the Sound Factory studios in Los Angeles.

Recording 
After putting the Fratellis on hiatus in 2009, Jon worked with singer/songwriter Lou Hickey on a project entitled Codeine Velvet Club. The duo recorded an album and played live during late 2009 and early 2010 before Jon announced he was departing the project to move onto a solo career. After playing a few shows (notably using musicians from Codeine Velvet Club, bar Hickey), Jon flew to LA with the band to record his debut album. He kept fans up to date on the songs he was working on via his Twitter feed. Finishing the album in November, under the working title The Magic Hour, Jon flew home and recorded an EP to release before the album. The first single was released in February 2011, called "Santo Domingo" (previously known as "Ham On Rye, named after a Charles Bukowski book") While writing, Jon decided to add a new song to the album and flew back to LA to record it. The song, "Baby, We're Refugees!" was released as the second single on 12 June 2011.

Jon has also since tried to add a song entitled "Dead Radio", but was unable to as Island locked down the dates. He has however played it live and recorded it in a stripped down form on a free podcast which is on his website.

Track listing 

A Scottish edition of the album was released with the following extra tracks. This version is also available on iTunes as the deluxe version, which also includes "Aeroplanes" as a pre-order bonus track and doesn't include "Sometimes You Just Can't Win".

Personnel 
Band
 Jon Fratelli - guitar, vocals
 Lewis Gordon - bass
 Ross MacFarlane - drums
 Will Foster - keyboards

Production
 Tony Hoffer - producer, mixer, programming
 Todd Burke - engineer
 Cameron Lister - assistant engineer

References

2011 albums